Viry-Châtillon is a commune in the southern suburbs of Paris, France.

Population

Inhabitants of Viry-Châtillon are known as Castelvirois in French.

Sports

The town is home to the women's football team Paris FC. It is also the base of the engine division of the Formula One constructor Alpine-Renault.

Twin towns – sister cities

Viry-Châtillon is twinned with:
 Erftstadt, Germany
 Wokingham, England, United Kingdom

Transport
Viry-Châtillon is served by Viry-Châtillon station on Paris RER line D.

See also
Communes of the Essonne department

References

External links
 
 Official website 
 Mayors of Essonne Association 
 

Communes of Essonne